Sewardstone is a hamlet and district of southern Waltham Abbey, in the Epping Forest District of Essex, England, lying between Epping Forest and the built-up areas of Waltham Abbey, Chingford and Enfield. It is 11.6 miles north-northeast of Central London and is in the London commuter belt. In 2018 it had an estimated population of 1128.

The area has scattered development, with large sections of open land. It is centred on the A112 road (Sewardstone Road), which connects Waltham Abbey and Chingford. The King George V Reservoir and Sewardstone Marsh form the boundary with the London Borough of Enfield, to the west. It is connected to Enfield Island Village by a footpath but not by road. A section of woodland forms the boundary with the London Borough of Waltham Forest to the south. To the east is High Beach.

The headquarters of the world Scout movement, Gilwell Park, is in Sewardstone.

Transport
To the south of the hamlet, London Buses Route 215 offers a frequent service from Lee Valley Camp Site to Walthamstow.

The nearest railway station is Chingford Station, which has frequent trains to London Liverpool Street Station.

The nearest London Underground station is at Loughton and has frequent trains to both London and Epping.

Nearest places
Sewardstonebury
Chingford
Walthamstow
Loughton
Waltham Abbey

References 

Hamlets in Essex
Waltham Abbey